Cynthia Cozette Lee, also known as Cynthia Cozette or Nazik Cynthia Cozette (born October 19, 1953, in Pittsburgh, Pennsylvania) is a contemporary African-American classical music composer and librettist. Cozette was the first African-American woman to graduate from the University of Pennsylvania with a Master of Arts degree in music composition. Cozette was also the first African-American woman graduate of the University of Pennsylvania to be instructed in music composition by the American composers, George Crumb and George Rochberg.

Early life and education 
Cozette is the great-granddaughter of Warren Garner, an African slave who fought during the American Civil War in the 4th Regiment Infantry of the United States Colored Troops. Cozette began her formal music training at 8 years old by studying piano with Carmen Rummo, a Duquesne University professor. She began studying flute at 10 years old. Her early flute teachers were Alois Hrabak, a former flutist with the Pittsburgh Symphony Orchestra, and Bernard Goldberg, the principal flutist of the Pittsburgh Symphony Orchestra. Cozette received the Victor Saudek Flute Award in 1969 to study with Goldberg. She began her musical composition training at 16 years old with Joseph Wilcox Jenkins, a Duquesne University music composition professor. Cozette's prize for winning an honorable mention award in the Pittsburgh Flute Club Composition Contest in 1969 was to have composition lessons with Jenkins.

Cozette attended Jacksonville University from 1971 to 1973 and her music composition teachers included William Hoskins. Cozette attended Carnegie Mellon University from 1973 to 1975. Cozette performed her senior recital in 1975 with Gary Chang, a fellow music composition student at Carnegie Mellon. She graduated from Carnegie Mellon University in 1975 with a Bachelor of Fine Arts Degree in Music Composition. Her music composition teachers at Carnegie Mellon included Leonardo Balada and Roland Leich. Cozette attended the University of Pennsylvania and graduated in 1977 with a Master of Arts Degree in Music Composition from the university. Her music composition teachers at University of Pennsylvania included George Crumb and George Rochberg.  Cozette studied music copying from 1977 to 1978 at the Juilliard School of Music with Arnold Arnstein, the personal music copyist to Leonard Bernstein, Gian-Carlo Menotti and Samuel Barber. She received her Master of Public Administration Degree from Rutgers University in 2005. She received her doctorate degree in education from Rowan University in 2009.

Music 
From the beginning of her composing career Cozette's music style was influenced by the French impressionistic composers, Debussy and Ravel. Cozette's music composition training directly stems from Eusebius Mandyczewski, a close friend and amanuensis of Johannes Brahms through her music composition instructors, Roland Leich and George Rochberg. Both of these instructors were students of Rosario Scalero, a pupil of Mandyczewski. Cozette's Black heritage greatly influences her music composition through her selection of music themes. Cozette completed two one act operas, Adea and The Black Guitar in 1982. However, had difficulty with obtaining publications of her works and recordings.  Cozette started sketches on her opera based on the life of her great-grandfather who fought as a soldier in the Civil War and turned to writing smaller compositions for solo flute and piano.

Cozette won national music awards for her compositions. Her Nigerian Treasures for Solo Unaccompanied Flute received a College Music Society Composition Award in 1985 and the work was premiered at the College Music Society Conference in Vancouver, British Columbia during November, 1985. Cozette was named to Mu Phi Epsilon's member list of outstanding Artists, Composers, Musicologists and Educators (ACME honor). With her sister, Hazel Ann Lee, she wrote the musical Magazine Watchtime.

Cozette's original music compositions have not been published, however, over 45 of her vocal, instrumental and operatic works are registered with the Library of Congress through the United States Copyright Office.

Productions 
From 1982 to 1984, Cozette produced and hosted her own classical music radio interview program on WPEB Public Radio entitled Classical Reflections. Her radio program was a forum for African-American classical musicians in Philadelphia to discuss their life and works. She also promoted African-American classical musicians by being a classical music consultant for a weekly radio show called The Marketplace created by Joe Adams for WUHY PBS Radio station from 1976 to 1977 (WUHY is now called WHYY-FM). Cozette produced and performed her one-woman show, Songs I Wrote For Broadway, in 2001 for the Women of Color Festival in New York.

Writings 
Cozette began writing poetry and fiction in 2000, as well as non-fiction essays. 
Lee, C.C. (2020). The Forgotten Schoolhouse: Original Poems and Stories on Faith, Love, Nature and Wonder. Covenant Books, Inc.
Lee. C.C. (2014). Native American Music and Living Legends. Teachers Institute of Philadelphia.
Lee, C. (2010). D.O.O.R.S. of Change: Capacity Building to Differentiated Instruction. Dissertation Published by ProQuest.
Lee, C. (November, 2000). Build a bias-free classroom. NJEA Review, 14-16.

Selected works

Operas
ADEA Opera in One Act and Three Scenes
The Black Guitar (La Guitarra Negra)
Partway To Freedom

Orchestral
Ebony Reflections for chamber orchestra 
Nepenthe Concerto for piano and orchestra
The Martyr for baritone and orchestra

Chamber music
Nigerian Treasures for solo unaccompanied flute 
Pittsburgh Memoirs in 3 Movements for flute trio 
Rivers: An African Tribute in 3 movements for solo unaccompanied flute 
The Steps of the Art Museum Three Poems for the piano 
Paris String Quartet 
Sweets for 4 Flutes in 3 Movements for flute quartet

Vocal/Choral
Colors for Women’s Chorus and Percussion Ensemble 
Las Canciones de Puerto Rico for SATB choir 
Make A Joyful Noise for SATB choir 
The Doctor’s Song Cycle for soprano, voice and piano

Musicals
Secretaries
Slavery Year 3000 
Songs I Wrote for Broadway, a Musical Review

References

Extended References 
 Africa Enchants Me Top Cultural Event. (2016, June 11). The Philadelphia Sunday Sun. Retrieved from https://www.philasun.com/local/africa-enchants-top-cultural-concert-event/
 Borgstedt, A. and Crocca, C. (2017, May 16). Carl Dupont Annual Recital May 15, 2016. Viva Voce Opera Guild of Rochester Newsletter. Retrieved from http://www.operaguildofrochester.org/newsletters/2016-June.htm
 Roland Leich Letters to Cynthia Cozette Lee Collection, 1976 to 2010, Pittsburgh Music Archives, Carnegie Library of Pittsburgh, Pittsburgh, PA
 Cynthia Cozette Lee Letters to Roland Leich Collection, 1976 to 2010, Pittsburgh Music Archives, Carnegie Library of Pittsburgh, Pittsburgh, PA
 Arnold Arnstein Interview with Cynthia Cozette Lee (Transcription). (1982, November 11), Roland Leich Collection, 1976 to 2010, (Box MSS C, Folder 5-10), John de Lancie Library, Curtis Institute of Music, Philadelphia, PA.
 Orchestral Music of Women of African Descent - Cynthia Cozette Lee. (n.d.). Women’s Philharmonic Advocacy. Retrieved from https://wophil.org/african/
 Younge, E. M. (2013, February 22). Partway To Freedom - A Civil War Opera" A Beautiful Work In Progress! Retrieved from https://eryounge.blogspot.com/
 G., Perry. (2015, March 16). Partway to Freedom at the Free Library. Retrieved from https://libwww.freelibrary.org/blog/post/2198
 Donahue, B. (2017, February 6). Rowan’s Faculty Spotlight Concert Honors Black History Month. The Whit Online Rowan University’s Campus Newspaper. Retrieved from https://thewhitonline.com/2017/02/arts-entertainment/rowans-faculty-spotlight-concert-honors-black-history-month/

External links 
Official website
Chamber Music America
Interview with Cynthia Cozette Lee
Doolee Playwrights Database
US Copyright Office
Alpha Epsilon Lambda Honor Society
Mu Phi Epsilon Competition Contest Winners

1953 births
20th-century American composers
20th-century American women musicians
20th-century classical composers
20th-century women composers
21st-century American composers
21st-century American women musicians
21st-century classical composers
21st-century women composers
African-American classical composers
American classical composers
African-American opera composers
African-American women classical composers
African-American women musicians
American women classical composers
Carnegie Mellon University College of Fine Arts alumni
Classical musicians from Pennsylvania
Jacksonville University alumni
Living people
Musicians from Philadelphia
Women opera composers